The Customs Museum is a museum concerning the customs service in Datong District, Taipei, Taiwan. The museum is located inside the Customs Building.

History
The discussion to set up the museum was brought up by Customs Administration in 1987. The museum was opened ten years later in 1996.

Exhibitions
The museum exhibits various scale models of lighthouse and historical uniforms and artifacts.

Transportation
The museum is accessible within walking distance northwest from Taipei Main Station.

See also
 List of museums in Taiwan

References

External links

 

1996 establishments in Taiwan
Customs services
Museums established in 1996
Museums in Taipei